Old Harbour is a town in southern Jamaica.

Transport 
It used to be served by a station on the national railway network. The nearby Port Esquivel is a major shipping hub for the exportation of bauxite and sugar. Port Esquivel is also the location of a tank farm constructed for ethanol but repurposed for petroleum distillates.

Location 

Old Harbour is located in southern St. Catherine near the island's southern coast. Nearby settlements and notable places include Old Harbour Bay, Longville Park, Free Town, McCooks Pen, Port Esquivel, Moores Pen and Little Goat Island.

See also 
 Railway stations in Jamaica

References 

https://www.google.com/maps/search/Old+Harbour+Bay/@17.9308891,-77.1641408,13z/data=!3m1!4b1

Populated places in Saint Catherine Parish